Alexandru Mihai Ișfan (born 31 January 2000) is a Romanian professional footballer who plays as a winger for Liga I club Universitatea Craiova.

Club career

Mioveni
Ișfan made his senior debut for his hometown club Mioveni on 9 March 2019, in a 0–2 loss to Metaloglobus București in the Liga II championship. He registered his first goal in the competition on 15 May that year, scoring in a 6–0 away thrashing of Dacia Unirea Brăila.

Argeș Pitești
On 20 April 2021, Ișfan signed with nearby Liga I team Argeș Pitești for a rumoured transfer fee of €50,000, with Mioveni also retaining 45% interest on the capital gain of a potential future sale. He made his professional debut on 17 July by starting in a 0–1 league loss to Universitatea Craiova.

In the winter transfer window of 2022, four-time defending champions CFR Cluj were interested in acquiring Ișfan, but a deal could not be agreed upon. He went on to amass 43 games and four goals in all competitions during his first season with "the White-Violets", as they finished on the sixth place overall in the league table.

On 29 July 2022, amid rumours of transfer bids from Universitatea Craiova and FCSB, Ișfan netted his first career double in a 3–1 Liga I defeat of recently-promoted Universitatea Cluj. On 9 August, it was announced that FC Argeș acquired his remaining federative rights for an undisclosed fee.

Universitatea Craiova
On 4 January 2023, Ișfan was transferred to Universitatea Craiova for a rumoured fee of €650,000 plus 25% interest. He signed a three-and-a-half-year deal with the option of another year with the Alb-albaștrii.

Career statistics

Club

References

External links
Alexandru Ișfan at Liga Profesionistă de Fotbal 

2000 births
Living people
People from Argeș County
Romanian footballers
Association football midfielders
Liga I players
Liga II players
Liga III players
CS Mioveni players
FC Argeș Pitești players
CS Universitatea Craiova players
Romania youth international footballers